Joeli is a masculine and feminine given name. Notable people with the name include:

Joeli Bulu, Fijian Christian missionary
Joeli Cawaki, Fijian politician
Joeli Lutumailagi (born 1985), Fijian rugby union player
Joeli Nabuka (died 2010), Fijian politician
Joeli Veitayaki (born 1967), Fijian rugby union player
Joeli Vidiri (born 1973), Fijian rugby union player

Masculine given names